From the Heart is a 1993 album released by Swedish singer Ankie Bagger. The album peaked at #50 in Sweden.

Track listing 
 "Where Is Love?" (Norell Oson Bard)
 "If You're Alone Tonight" (Norell Oson Bard)
 "Coming from the Heart" (Norell Oson Bard)
 "Bang Bang" (Norell Oson Bard)
 "How Can I Say I'm Sorry" (Tommy Ekman)
 "When I Call Your Name" (Norell Oson Bard)
 "I'm Still in Love With You" (Alexander Bard, Holonen, Jernström, Ola Håkansson, Salmi)
 "Every Day Every Hour" (Norell Oson Bard)
 "Here I Go Again" (Alexander Bard, Anders Hansson, Ola Håkansson)
 "The Way I Dream About You" (Norell Oson Bard)

References 

1993 albums
Ankie Bagger albums